Rainer Åkerfelt (born December 2, 1934 in Snappertuna) is a Finnish sprint canoer who competed in the early 1960s. He was eliminated in the semifinals of the K-2 1000 m event at the 1960 Summer Olympics in Rome.

References
Sports-reference.com profile

1934 births
Living people
People from Raseborg
Canoeists at the 1960 Summer Olympics
Finnish male canoeists
Olympic canoeists of Finland
Sportspeople from Uusimaa